Gentianella barringtonensis, the Barrington snow gentian, is a species of the genus Gentianella native to New South Wales, Australia.

References

barringtonensis